Tetragonoderus intersectus is a species of beetle in the family Carabidae. It was described by Ernst Friedrich Germar in 1824. It feeds on various vegetable leaves such as cabbage and beet.

References

intersectus
Beetles described in 1824